Lieutenant Colonel Jimi Koroi is a Fijian Military and Police officer.  He was named Acting Commissioner of Police by the Military administration on 6 December 2006, one day after the coup d'état which deposed the government of Laisenia Qarase.  Koroi's appointment was made in an interim capacity, to take over from Andrew Hughes, an opponent of the Military takeover.

Koroi was replaced on 9 February 2007 by Romanu Tikotikoca, and was expected to be given a new posting with a commission investigating alleged corruption in the deposed government.

Fijian police chiefs
Fijian soldiers
Living people
I-Taukei Fijian people
Year of birth missing (living people)